Behind the Candelabra is a 2013 American biographical drama film directed by Steven Soderbergh. It dramatizes the last ten years in the life of pianist Liberace and the relationship that he had with Scott Thorson. It is based on Thorson's memoir, Behind the Candelabra: My Life with Liberace (1988). Richard LaGravenese wrote the screenplay. Jerry Weintraub was the executive producer.

It premiered at the 2013 Cannes Film Festival on May 21, 2013, and competed for the Palme d'Or. It aired on HBO on May 26, 2013, and was given a cinematic release in the United Kingdom on June 7, 2013. The film received critical acclaim from television critics, including praise for the performances of Michael Douglas and Matt Damon. It marked the final onscreen acting role for Debbie Reynolds before her death in 2016.

Plot
In 1977, 18-year-old Scott Thorson, who works as an animal trainer for films, meets Bob Black, a Hollywood producer, in a gay bar in Los Angeles.  At Black's urging, he leaves his adopted home in search of better-paying work.  Black introduces Thorson to Liberace, who takes an immediate liking to the handsome younger man.  Liberace invites the two backstage and then to his luxurious home in Las Vegas.

Thorson observes that one of Liberace's beloved dogs has a temporary form of blindness, and with his veterinary assistant background, informs the famous pianist that he knows how to cure the condition.  After treating the dog, Thorson becomes Liberace's "assistant" at the performer's request. Thorson also becomes employed as Liberace's stage chauffeur, driving a Rolls-Royce limousine onto the stage for Liberace's grand entrances.

Thorson moves in with Liberace and becomes his lover.  At this point, Thorson says that he is bisexual because he is also attracted to women.  Liberace is sympathetic, informing him that he wanted and tried to love women, but was exclusively attracted to men.  He relates a story of a "divine healing" in which a "messenger" informed him that God still loved him.

It gradually becomes clear that Liberace is trying to mold Thorson into a younger version of himself.  He asks his plastic surgeon, Dr. Jack Startz, to transform Scott's face to more closely resemble his own and makes an unsuccessful attempt to formally adopt him.  Thorson soon turns to drugs as he becomes angrier and more frustrated with Liberace trying to control him as well as Liberace's obsession to publicly hide their romance at any cost.

By 1982, Thorson's increasing drug abuse and Liberace's interest in younger men, including dancer Cary James, creates a rift that ultimately destroys their relationship.  When Liberace begins visiting pornographic peep shows and suggests that they each see other people, Thorson becomes upset.

Scott Thorson retains an attorney to seek his financial share of the property by suing Liberace for over $100,000,000 in palimony.  As a result, Liberace ends their formal partnership and involves himself with his most recent, and much younger, "assistant".  In 1984, Thorson's palimony lawsuit starts where he gives details about his romance for five years with the entertainer, while Liberace flatly denies any sexual relationship.

Not long thereafter, in December 1986, Thorson receives a telephone call from Liberace telling him that he is very ill with what is later revealed to be AIDS and that he would like Thorson to visit him again.  Thorson agrees and drives to Liberace's retreat house in Palm Springs, where he and Liberace have one last, emotional conversation. Liberace dies a few months later in February 1987.  Thorson attends Liberace's funeral, in which he imagines seeing Liberace performing one last time with his traditional flamboyance, before being lifted to Heaven with a stage harness.

Cast
 Michael Douglas as Liberace
 Matt Damon as Scott Thorson
 Dan Aykroyd as Seymour Heller
 Rob Lowe as Dr. Jack Startz
 Debbie Reynolds as Frances Liberace
 Scott Bakula as Bob Black
 Boyd Holbrook as Cary James
 Tom Papa as Ray Arnett
 Nicky Katt as Mr. Y
 Cheyenne Jackson as Billy Leatherwood (based on Liberace's protégé Vince Cardell)
 Paul Reiser as Mr. Felder
 David Koechner as Adoption Attorney
 Peggy King as TV Vocalist (When Liberace Winks at Me)

Production

Director Steven Soderbergh first spoke with Michael Douglas about the idea of doing a Liberace film during the production of Traffic (2000), but had trouble figuring out an angle for it that would differentiate it from a traditional biopic. In the summer of 2008, Soderbergh contacted screenwriter Richard LaGravenese with the idea of adapting Scott Thorson's memoir Behind the Candelabra: My Life with Liberace. In September 2008, the project was officially announced with Matt Damon close to signing on to play Thorson and Douglas in talks to portray Liberace.

The following year, Douglas officially signed on to play Liberace alongside Damon. The film spent several years in development while Soderbergh had difficulty securing funding, with Hollywood studios saying it was "too gay". During this time, Douglas and Damon remained adamant that they would appear in the film despite its lengthy development. Ultimately, the film was picked up by HBO Films and shot on a budget of $23 million over thirty days in 2012.

While promoting the film, Soderbergh went on to explain that this would be his last directorial effort for the time being. It is also the last film to feature a musical score by composer Marvin Hamlisch, who died on August 6, 2012.

Scenes set in Las Vegas were filmed at Zsa Zsa Gabor's mansion in Bel Air (interior and some exterior shots) and Siegfried & Roy's mansion in Las Vegas (driveway); Liberace's West Hollywood penthouse had been converted into an office space after his death, but the building's owner convinced the current occupants to temporarily relocate during filming, and the space was returned to Liberace's original design. Performances were filmed at the Las Vegas Hilton, where Liberace once had a residency. Production design was credited to Howard Cummings, and sets were decorated by Barbara Munch Cameron.

The pianos used in the film were also once owned by Liberace; one of the pianos used in the opening scenes had been purchased by Debbie Gibson at the 1988 estate sale. Michael Douglas' head was digitally composited onto the body of Philip Fortenberry for the piano playing performances. Fortenberry, who had entertained audiences at the Liberace Museum, stated the rings needed to be glued to his fingers: "These rings kept flopping around and clicking on the keys."

Reception

Critical response

The film received critical acclaim. Review aggregation website Rotten Tomatoes gives the film an approval rating of 94%, based on reviews from 108 film critics with an average score of 8.1 out of 10. The website's critical consensus reads: "Affectionate without sacrificing honesty, Behind the Candelabra couples award-worthy performances from Michael Douglas and Matt Damon with some typically sharp direction from Steven Soderbergh." Metacritic, which assigns a weighted average score out of 100 to reviews from mainstream critics, gives the film a score of 83 based on 30 reviews.

Peter Bradshaw of The Guardian gave the film 4/5 stars, saying "As a black comedy, and as a portrait of celebrity loneliness, Behind the Candelabra is very stylish and effective, and Damon and Douglas give supremely entertaining performances."

Ratings

The film, shown for the first time on American television on May 26, 2013, was watched by 2.4 million US viewers. A further 1.1 million tuned in to watch the repeat immediately after, bringing viewership to 3.5 million in total. When the film debuted on HBO, it achieved the highest ratings for a television film since 2004.

Accolades

See also
 List of films set in Las Vegas

Notes

References

External links

 
 
 

2013 television films
2013 films
2013 biographical drama films
2013 in American television
2013 LGBT-related films
2013 romantic drama films
2010s American films
2010s English-language films
American biographical drama films
American drama television films
American LGBT-related television films
American romantic drama films
Best Miniseries or Television Movie Golden Globe winners
Biographical films about LGBT people
Biographical films about musicians
Biographical television films
Cultural depictions of Liberace
Films about death
Films about pianos and pianists
Films based on memoirs
Films directed by Steven Soderbergh
Films scored by Marvin Hamlisch
Films set in the 1970s
Films set in the 1980s
Films set in Los Angeles
Films set in Palm Springs, California
Films shot in Los Angeles
Gay-related films
HBO Films films
HIV/AIDS in American films
HIV/AIDS in television
LGBT-related romantic drama films
Primetime Emmy Award for Outstanding Made for Television Movie winners
Primetime Emmy Award-winning television series
Romance films based on actual events
Romance television films
Television films based on books
Works about plastic surgery